Aleksandar Kesar (born 4 February 1972) is a Serbian professional basketball coach. He last served as a head coach for the Tianjin Pioneers of the Chinese Basketball Association (CBA).

Coaching career 
Kesar was an assistant coach of Partizan and Olympiacos. He was a head coach for Mega Aqua Monta, Azovmash Mariupol, Shandong Gold Lions, Fujian Sturgeons, and Tianjin Pioneers.

National team coaching career 
Kesar was an assistant coach of Dušan Ivković in the national team of Serbia at two FIBA EuroBaskets, 2009 in Poland and 2011 in Lithuania, and at the 2010 FIBA World Championship in Turkey. He won silver medal at EuroBasket 2009.

He led the university team of Serbia at two Summer Universiades, 2007 in Bangkok and 2009 in Belgrade. He won a gold medal at 2009 Universiade and a silver medal at 2007 Universiade.

Career achievements and awards
As assistant coach
EuroLeague champion: 1 (with Olympiacos: 2011–12)
Serbian League champion: 1 (with Partizan: 2006–07)
Serbian-Montenegrin League champion: 4 (with Partizan: 2002–03, 2003–04, 2004-05, 2005-06)
Greek League champion: 1 (with Olympiacos: 2011–12)
Adriatic League champion: 1 (with Partizan: 2006–07)
Greek Cup winner: 1 (with Olympiacos: 2010–11)

Personal life
Aleksandar is married. He and his wife, Ana, have two daughters, Klara and Atina.

References

1972 births
Living people
KK Mega Basket coaches
KK Partizan players
Serbian expatriate basketball people in Greece
Serbian men's basketball coaches
Serbian men's basketball players
Sportspeople from Belgrade
Serbian expatriate basketball people in China
Serbian expatriate basketball people in Russia
Serbian expatriate basketball people in Ukraine
Yugoslav men's basketball players